Trego is an unincorporated community, and census-designated place (CDP), in Lincoln County, Montana, United States. As of the 2010 census it had a population of 541. Trego is located 1.5 miles west of Highway 93 and serves as the gateway community to the Tobacco Valley.

History
One of the primary settlers, and most notable residents of Trego, was the Fortin Family. The patriarch of the family, Octave Fortin, was originally from Canada and moved west with his wife to Butte, Montana, gaining their US Citizenship. In 1896, Octave purchased a large tract of land in Trego, which was just east of the rail line and general store, and turned it into a working ranch, raising cattle, chickens, pigs and harvesting hay. In 1900 he constructed the family house, a white farmhouse in the center of the ranch. The original farmhouse still stands today, in its original state and location on the ranch, in the heart of Trego. 

The neighboring community of Fortine, about four miles north of Trego, was initially supposed to be named Trego, and the current town of Trego was to be named Fortine, after the Fortin Family. However, due to a clerical error by the Great Northern Railway, the train station names in each town were reversed, and instead of correcting the error, the railway opted to leave them as is. 

Trego was traditionally a logging community as well as a station on the Great Northern Railway line. The first post office was established in 1911. It was named after Anna Trego Hogeland, wife of chief engineer A. H. Hogeland.

Currently, Trego is home to a popular restaurant known as The Trego Pub, a community hall, volunteer fire department, a US Post Office, and to several local artisans. Trego is also home to a local garden center and nursery, an organic produce farm, and the original Fortin ranch is still being operated as a grass-fed, grass-finished cattle ranch to this day.

Geography
Trego is in northeastern Lincoln County and occupies a large portion of the valley of Fortine Creek and surrounding countryside. US 93 leads northwest  to Eureka and southeast  to Whitefish.

Demographics

References

Census-designated places in Lincoln County, Montana
Census-designated places in Montana